The Bank of America Plaza is a skyscraper located in Downtown St. Louis, Missouri. Formerly Boatmen's Bancshares of St. Louis and First National Bank, the tower is 384 ft (117m) tall and has 31 floors. Built in 1982 by Fruin-Colnon Construction, it comprises , and has a view of the downtown skyline. It is the tenth tallest office building in Downtown St. Louis.

The building won the Building Owners and Managers Association (BOMA) “Building of the Year” awards for the years 1996 through 1999.

Ralcorp and subsidiary Post Foods have their headquarters in the building. During that year PricewaterhouseCoopers leased space in the Bank of America Plaza, which was 96% occupied.

History
In 2003 the General Electric Pension Trust, the owner of the Bank of America Plaza, offered to sell the building. In August 2014, part of the staff of Spire inc. Was moved to the building.

See also
List of tallest buildings in St. Louis

References

External links
Bank of America Plaza (St. Louis)
Bank of America Plaza on Emporis.com

Bank of America buildings
Skyscraper office buildings in St. Louis

Office buildings completed in 1981
Downtown St. Louis
Buildings and structures in St. Louis
1982 establishments in Missouri